Erenler is a municipality and district governorate in Greater Sakarya, Turkey. Sakarya is one of the 30 metropolitan centers in Turkey with more than one municipality within city borders. Now in Sakarya city (former Adapazarı)  there are four second-level municipalities in addition to Greater Sakarya (büyükşehir) municipality.

Geography
Erenler is a part of Sakarya city. Sakarya River flows within the municipality.

History
During the Ottoman Empire era, Erenler was a village. Between 14 March 1921 and 21 June 1921 the village saw occupation by the Greek army. During the Republican era, the population of the village increased and consequently it became a seat of township in 1963. In 1999 Erenler suffered from the İzmit earthquake. Soon after the disaster, the town continued its growth, and it merged to the province capital. However, in 2008 it became an ilçe (district) center of Sakarya Province.

Population
As of 2014, the population of Erenler was 79,934.

The development of the population of Erenler from its establishment is shown in the following chart:

References

Districts of Sakarya Province
2008 establishments in Turkey